Dendropoma irregulare is a species of sea snail, a marine gastropod mollusk in the family Vermetidae, the worm snails or worm shells.

Distribution
Found in Gulf of Mexico and Caribbean Sea.

Description 
The maximum recorded shell length is 36 mm.

Habitat 
Minimum recorded depth is 0 m. Maximum recorded depth is 7 m.

References

Vermetidae
Gastropods described in 1841